The Fire Gospel is a 2008  novel by Michel Faber published by Canongate Books in its Myth Series.

Summary 
The Fire Gospel is a reinterpretation of the myth of Prometheus that broadly satirises the publishing industry. The plot centres on an expert in Aramaic, Theo Griepenkerl, who discovers nine papyrus scrolls following the bombing of an Iraqi museum. The scrolls contain the lost gospel of Malchus, a servant who witnessed the Crucifixion of Jesus, and Theo's translation becomes a publishing sensation.

References

External links 
 
 
 

2008 British novels
Canongate Books books
British satirical novels
Novels about religion